Błażejowice may refer to the following places:
Błażejowice, Brzeg County in Opole Voivodeship (south-west Poland)
Błażejowice, Kędzierzyn-Koźle County in Opole Voivodeship (south-west Poland)
Błażejowice, Silesian Voivodeship (south Poland)